Saratoga is a city in Santa Clara County, California. Located in Silicon Valley, in the southern Bay Area, its population was 31,051 at the 2020 census. Saratoga is an affluent residential community, known for its wineries, restaurants, and attractions like Villa Montalvo, Mountain Winery, and Hakone Gardens.

History

The area comprising Saratoga was earlier inhabited by the Ohlone Native Americans. An early map noted the area as Campbell's Gap.

In 1851, Martin McCarthy, who had leased the mill, built a toll road down to the Santa Clara Valley, and founded what is now Saratoga as McCarthysville. The toll gate was located at the present-day intersection of Big Basin Way and 3rd St., giving the town its first widely used name: Toll Gate. In 1867 the town received a post office under the name of McCarthysville.

Early residents, who moved to Saratoga in 1881, were Mary Brown (1816–1884), widow of John Brown the abolitionist, her daughters Sarah and Ellen, and the husband of the latter, James Fablinger. All are buried in Madronia Cemetery.

Industry soon sprang up and at its pinnacle, the town had a furniture factory, grist mill, tannery, and a paper factory. To commemorate this newfound productivity, the town was renamed again in 1863 as Bank Mills. In the 1850s, Jud Caldwell discovered springs which were called Pacific Congress Springs because the water had a mineral content similar to Congress Springs in Saratoga Springs, New York. In 1865 the town received its final name, Saratoga, after the city in New York. At the same time a resort hotel called Congress Hall was constructed at the springs, named after the  famous resort Congress Hall at Saratoga Springs, New York. California's Congress Hall attracted tourists to the area until it burned down in 1903. These events would eventually lead to Saratoga being listed as a California Historical Landmark in 1950.

Saratoga became agricultural, as did much of the rest of the valley; a few vineyards and orchards from this period remain today. After World War II the town quickly became urbanized, and it incorporated in 1956 mostly to avoid being annexed by San Jose. A slogan during the campaign to incorporate the city of Saratoga was "Keep it rural," according to historian Willys I. Peck. Today the city serves as a bedroom community for upper-middle class and upper class Silicon Valley tech workers and executives.

Saratoga drew notoriety for the suicide of Audrie Pott, a 15-year-old Saratoga High School student, September 2012. The three teenagers charged with sexually assaulting Pott pleaded guilty and served time in juvenile hall for the sexual assault.

Geography

Saratoga is bordered by Cupertino and San Jose to the north, a small portion of Campbell and Los Gatos to the east, and Monte Sereno to the southeast. Within its borders, Saratoga includes lush redwood forests, foothills suitable for wine grapes and sunny valley floor once covered with prune and apricot orchards, now with suburban homes, schools and churches.

Neighborhoods in Saratoga include Brookview and Pride's Crossing in the north part of the city, Blue Hills and Greenbrier in the northwest area, and Congress Springs in the southwestern corner of Saratoga. The Golden Triangle, a name invented by real estate agents, is an area bounded by Saratoga Avenue, Saratoga-Sunnyvale Road and Cox Avenue. The Golden Triangle consists mostly of four-bedroom ranch homes (with values ranging from between $1 to $3 million) on quarter acre lots that are gradually being replaced by Mediterranean custom designs. Northeast of the Golden Triangle is a neighborhood known as Saratoga Woods, a small community located behind Prospect High School north of Cox. Bellgrove Circle is a popular neighborhood located next to highway 85. The land of Bellgrove Circle, once used as a vineyard, was previously owned by Paul Masson Winery and is east of Saratoga Avenue and north of Rt 85.  Kentfield is south of Rt 85 and also east of Saratoga Avenue.  Parker Ranch is a very affluent neighborhood with  minimum lots, west of Saratoga-Sunnyvale Road and up into the hills.  The downtown area along Big Basin Way is known as the Village.

Demographics

2010

The 2010 United States Census reported that Saratoga had a population of 29,926. The racial makeup of Saratoga was 16,125 (53.9%) White, 94 (0.3%) African American, 41 (0.1%) Native American, 12,376 (41.4%) Asian, 23 (0.1%) Pacific Islander, 202 (0.7%) from other races, and 1,065 (3.6%) from two or more races. There were 1,034 Hispanic or Latino residents of any race (3.5%).

The Census reported that 29,727 people (99.3% of the population) lived in households, 34 (0.1%) lived in non-institutionalized group quarters, and 165 (0.6%) were institutionalized.

There were 10,734 households, out of which 4,024 (37.5%) had children under the age of 18 living in them, 7,893 (73.5%) were opposite-sex married couples living together, 608 (5.7%) had a female householder with no husband present, 213 (2.0%) had a male householder with no wife present.  There were 159 (1.5%) unmarried opposite-sex partnerships, and 44 (0.4%) same-sex married couples or partnerships. 1,740 households (16.2%) were made up of individuals, and 1,115 (10.4%) had someone living alone who was 65 years of age or older. The average household size was 2.77.  There were 8,714 families (81.2% of all households); the average family size was 3.11.

In Saratoga, 7,173 people (24.0%) were under the age of 18, 1,390 people (4.6%) were aged 18 to 24, 4,678 people (15.6%) were aged 25 to 44, 10,598 people (35.4%) aged 45 to 64, and 6,087 people (20.3%) who were 65 years of age or older.  The median age was 47.8 years. For every 100 females, there were 95.7 males.  For every 100 females age 18 and over, there were 92.6 males.

The homeowner vacancy rate was 0.7%; the rental vacancy rate was 4.3%.  26,201 people (87.6% of the population) lived in owner-occupied housing units and 3,526 people (11.8%) lived in rental housing units.

In 2011, Bloomberg Businessweek reported that the average household income was $237,804 with an average household net worth of $1,516,018.

2000

As of the census of 2000, there were 29,843 people, 10,450 households, and 8,600 families residing in the city.  The population density was 951.5/km2 (2,465.3/mi2).  There were 10,649 housing units at an average density of 339.5/km2 (879.7/mi2). The racial makeup of the city was 67.39% White, 0.39% African American, 0.15% Native American, 29.08% Asian, 0.08% Pacific Islander, 0.57% from other races, and 2.33% from two or more races.  3.14% of the population were Hispanic or Latino of any race.

There were 10,450 households, out of which 38.7% had children under the age of 18 living with them, 75.0% were married couples living together, 4.9% had a female householder with no husband present, and 17.7% were non-families. 14.3% of all households were made up of individuals, and 7.6% had someone living alone who was 65 years of age or older.  The average household size was 2.83 and the average family size was 3.13.  The population-age distribution was as follows: 26.0% under the age of 18, 4.0% from 18 to 24, 23.8% from 25 to 44, 29.9% from 45 to 64, and 16.3% who were 65 years of age or older.  The median age was 43 years. For every 100 females, there were 96.5 males.  For every 100 females age 18 and over, there were 92.6 males.

According to a 2007 estimate the median income for a household in the city was $137,270, and the median income for a family was $159,765. Males had a median income of $75,000 versus $66,240 for females. The per capita income for the city was $65,400.  About 1.8% of families and 2.8% of the population were below the poverty line, including 3.2% of those under age 18 and 2.6% over 64.

Economy

The 2016 Coldwell Banker Home Listing Report listed Saratoga as the most expensive housing market in the United States. In 2010, Bloomberg Businessweek named Saratoga the most expensive suburb in California. According to CNN Money, 70.42% of Saratoga households have an income greater than $100,000.

Saratoga was ranked by Forbes in 2009 as one of America's top 20 most-educated small towns. Bloomberg Businessweek named Saratoga's zip code 95070 the 18th richest zip code in America in 2011. In 2018, data from the American Community Survey revealed that Saratoga was the 8th wealthiest city in the United States.

Government

Saratoga is a general law city under California law, meaning that the organization and powers of the city are established by state law. It has a council–manager form of government. The current mayor is Kookie Fitzsimmons. Vice Mayor is Yan Zhao. Other current council members are Belal Aftab, Chuck Page, and Tina Walia.

The Saratoga City Council has had to make many controversial decisions in a community with residents known to be protectionist of their existing exclusivity. The council was a leader in dealing with the unfunded pension crisis in California.

Education

Various public school districts serve Saratoga. At elementary level (grades K to 8) these include Saratoga Union School District, Campbell Union School District, Cupertino Union School District and Moreland School District. High school districts that serve Saratoga include the Los Gatos-Saratoga Joint Union High School District, Fremont Union High School District and Campbell Union High School District. These districts provide a number of high schools including 
Saratoga High School, Monta Vista High School (located in Cupertino but servicing a portion of Saratoga), Lynbrook High School (located in San Jose but servicing a portion of Saratoga as well), Prospect High School and Westmont High School (located in Campbell but servicing a portion of Saratoga).

Private schools in the area include Challenger School, Saint Andrew's School, and Sacred Heart School.

West Valley Community College provides college-level education in the district whilst the Santa Clara County Library District operates the Saratoga Library.

Transportation

The original alignment of Highway 85 along Saratoga-Sunnyvale Road was deleted in 1994 when the West Valley Freeway was completed, and it passes through northeast Saratoga. Highway 85 has one onramp/offramp within the city, at Saratoga Avenue; while the original plans for the freeway also included exits at Quito Road and Prospect Avenue, objections by residents kept those interchanges from being constructed.  Street signs are brown in color.

The Union Pacific Railroad operates freight through the town, servicing the nearby Permanente Quarry. The rail line travels parallel to Route 85. Passenger trains, including the Peninsular Railway, operated starting in 1908, delivering commuters to San Francisco in 90 minutes. Saratoga currently has no passenger train service; it has minimal bus service.

Saratoga also has a zoning code aimed at preserving a semi-rural appearance. Saratoga emphasizes its semi-rural appearance by foregoing street lights and sidewalks on most residential streets.  This contributes to Saratoga's high housing costs.

The Blue Hills neighborhood of Saratoga has many hiking trails for use by residents that are owned by the City of Saratoga.

Sister cities
  Muko, Japan (1983)

Notable people
 Alex Brightman (born 1987), actor (Beetlejuice, School of Rock)
 Mary Brown (1816–1884), widow of John Brown the abolitionist, her daughters Sarah and Ellen, and the husband of the latter, James Fablinger. All are buried in Madronia Cemetery.
 Michael Burry (born 1971), physician and hedge fund manager
 Stephanie Elam (born 1974), news anchor (CNN,  NBC)
 Joan Fontaine (1917–2013), Oscar-winning actress
 Devon Graye (born 1987), actor (Merry Christmas, Drake & Josh)
 Steve Harwell (born 1967), lead singer of the band Smash Mouth
 Olivia de Havilland (1916–2020), Oscar-winning actress
 Dan Janjigian (born 1972), actor and bobsledder
 Ernest Konnyu (born 1937), Republican Congressman who resided in Saratoga while in office.
 Anil Kumar (born 1958), management consultant who pled guilty to insider trading
 Sam Liccardo (born 1970), politician (mayor of San Jose) 
 Beth Lisick (born 1968), spoken-word artist, leader of the band The Beth Lisick Ordeal, and author
 Patrick Marleau (born 1979), former San Jose Sharks player
 Abijah McCall, orchardist and inventor of the Fresno Scraper
 Mekenna Melvin (born 1985), actress
 Pranav Mistry, (born 1981), Indian-born computer scientist and inventor
 Joe Murray (born 1961), Emmy-winning animator, best known as the creator of Rocko's Modern Life and Camp Lazlo.
 Anil Raj (1984–2019), humanitarian activist, killed in terror attack in Kabul in 2019 while working for U.N.
 James Rumbaugh (born 1947), computer scientist
 Dan Rusanowsky (born 1960), radio broadcaster
 Vincent Sheu (born 1990), Rubik’s Cube speedsolver
 Ed Solomon (born 1960), screenwriter (Men in Black)
 Steven Spielberg (born 1946), filmmaker (graduated from Saratoga High, having attended it for his senior year)
 Mark Suciu (born 1992), professional skateboarder
 Vienna Teng (born 1978), singer
 Joe Thornton (born 1979), former San Jose Sharks captain
 Lance Guest (born 1960), actor
 Kerri Walsh (born 1978), Gold Medal-winning Olympian (beach volleyballer)
 James Williamson (born 1949), electronics engineer and guitarist of the Stooges

References

External links

 
 Saratoga Historical Foundation

 
Populated places established in 1848
Incorporated cities and towns in California
Cities in Santa Clara County, California
Cities in the San Francisco Bay Area
Silicon Valley
California Historical Landmarks
1848 establishments in California